Eberhard Havekost (1967 – 5 July 2019) was a contemporary German painter based in Berlin and Dresden, who exhibited internationally.

Biography 
Born in Dresden, Havekost was the son of a sculptor and a taxidermist. He completed an internship as a stonemason in 1985. In 1989, he fled to the West via Budapest and lived in Frankfurt. He studied at the Hochschule für Bildende Künste in Dresden from 1991 to 1996, where he became a master student under Professor Ralf Kerbach in 1997. In 1999 he was awarded the Karl Schmidt-Rottluff grant. He lived in Berlin, and was a professor at the Kunstakademie Düsseldorf.

Work 
Havekost was one of a new generation of painters who used a digitalized, multimedial visual language in their work. Working from photographic sources – shots from TV and video, images culled from magazines and catalogues and his own photographs – he selected subjects ranging from anonymous buildings, trains and trailers, and modified them to make inkjet prints as the departure point for his paintings. Among the subjects which regularly recur are nature, portraits or figures, architectural interiors and exteriors, and means of transportation such as caravans, aeroplanes and automobiles. He often painted series of repetitive images to replicate the serial change of visual effect in nature. The theme of a 2007 25-part series of paintings is zensur or censorship, and the artist applies the concept of blocking or erasing something thematically or formally. Retina is a 2010 series of six oil paintings that deal with the optical perception of the world of objects and their abstraction.

In 2005, art critic David Pagel described Havekost in the Los Angeles Times as "a promising painter so deeply indebted to Richter's version of abbreviated Photorealism that it appears he has not yet come into his own". In The New York Times, Roberta Smith wrote that "the blunt dispatch and immediacy of Mr. Havekost's surfaces, while suitably laconic, run counter to the randomness and remove of the images, providing a necessary disconcerting tension."

Collection 
Works by Havekost are found in the stock of the Museum of Modern Art, the Denver Art Museum as well as in the Marx Collection, the Rubell Family Collection, the Frieder Burda Collection, and the Tate Collection. He is represented by Anton Kern in New York and Galerie Gebr. Lehmann in Dresden and Berlin. He had solo exhibitions at the Kunsthalle Schirn in Frankfurt, Staatliche Kunstsammlungen Dresden, Kunstmuseum Wolfsburg, and the Stedelijk Museum Amsterdam.

Art market 
Havekost is represented by Contemporary Fine Arts in Berlin, Anton Kern Gallery in New York, Roberts Projects in Los Angeles, and White Cube in London, among many other international venues.

Solo exhibitions 

 2008 Eberhard Havekost, FRAC Auvergne
 2008 Zensur 2, Galerie Gebr. Lehmann, Dresden/Berlin
 2007 Zensur, Anton Kern Gallery, New York
 2007 Background, White Cube, London
 2006 Paintings from the Rubell Family Collection, American University Museum, Katzen Arts Center, Washington DC
 2006 Harmony 2, Stedelijk Museum Amsterdam
 2006 backstage, Galerie Gebr. Lehmann, Dresden
 2005 Sonnenschutz, Roberts & Tilton, Los Angeles
 2004 Brandung, Galerie Gebr. Lehmann, Dresden
 2004 Graphik 1999-2004, Kupferstich-Kabinett Dresden
 2004 Marvel, Anton Kern Gallery, New York
 2003 Centre d`art contemporain Georges Pompidou, Cajarc
 2003 dynamic UND, Inside the White Cube, London
 2003 Beauty walks a razors edge, Galerie Gebr. Lehmann, Dresden
 2003 Square, Anton Kern Gallery, New York
 2001 DRIVER, Museu de Arte Contemporanea de Serralves, Porto
 2001 Dimmer, Galerie Gebr. Lehmann, Dresden
 2001 Pressure-Pressure, Anton Kern Gallery, New York
 2000 Kontakt, Galerie Gebr. Lehmann, Dresden
 1999 Statements, Art Basel, Basel
 1998 ZOOM, Anton Kern Gallery, New York
 1998 Fenster-Fenster, Kunstmuseum Luzern
 1997 Frieren, Galerie Gebr. Lehmann, Dresden

References

External links 
 
 Eberhard Havekost Anton Kern Gallery
 Roberts Projects / Eberhard Havekost Roberts & Tilton, Culver City, CA
 Eberhard Havekost – Painting Saatchi Gallery
 Eberhard Havekost Galerie Gebr. Lehmann
 Eberhard Havekost Artcyclopedia
 Eberhard Havekost artnet.de

1967 births
2019 deaths
20th-century German painters
20th-century German male artists
German male painters
21st-century German painters
21st-century German male artists
German contemporary artists